Espejoa is a genus of Mesoamerican flowering plants in the daisy family.

There is only one known species, Espejoa mexicana, native to Chiapas, Oaxaca, Guatemala, Honduras, El Salvador, Costa Rica.

References

Monotypic Asteraceae genera
Bahieae
Flora of North America